KNEEMO is a training network for knee osteoarthritis research, funded by the European Commission’s Framework 7 Programme (FP7). KNEEEMO includes 15 research projects for early career researchers who are employed at eight different host institutions across Europe.

A combination of existing best practices from the members of KNEEMO consortium is included in the training programme of the project. The aim of this programme is to enhance the skills of the researchers in both discipline and generic topics.

‌The project has received funding from the European Union’s Seventh Framework Programme for research, technological development and demonstration under grant agreement no. 607510.

KNEEMO Network

Full Partners 
 Glasgow Caledonian University
 Aalborg University
 Paracelsus Private Medical University of Salzburg
 Peacocks medical group
 University of Münster
 University of Southern Denmark
 VU University Medical Center Amsterdam
 Xsens

Associated Partners 
 AnyBody Technology 
 Chondrometrics 
 European Society for Movement Analysis in Adults and Children (ESMAC) 
 Institute of Knowledge Transfer (IKT) 
 Reade, center for rehabilitation and rheumatology  
 University of Melbourne
 University of Twente

Training Events

Notes 

Organizations established in 2014
Arthritis organizations
Knee
2014 establishments in Europe